The LNWR Newton Class was a class of ninety-six  steam locomotives built by the London and North Western Railway at their Crewe Works between 1866 and 1873.

They were designed by John Ramsbottom who had 76 built, all without cabs and with pierced driving wheel splashers. Ramsbottom's successor F. W. Webb, built twenty more, all with cabs. The earlier locomotives also gained cabs, and all eventually had the splashers filled in.

All were 'renewed' (replaced) by a like number of LNWR Improved Precedent Class between 1887 and 1894.

Fleet list

Lancashire & Yorkshire Railway
In 1873 ten locomotives of the type were built at Crewe for the Lancashire and Yorkshire Railway (L&YR) and utilised on passenger expresses between Blackpool, Manchester and Yorkshire.  They were given the numbers 456–462 and 731–733.  Most were fitted with replacement boilers about and other standard L&YR parts 1888.  They were then used on Liverpool−Manchester expresses on the new L&YR route.  The more powerful Barton Wright s took over on the more demanding sections to Yorkshire though the Ramsbottom engines were considered faster on light loads.  Most were withdrawn in the period 1895 to 1897 but Nos. 461, 462 and 731 lasted to 1904, 1912 and 1926 respectively.  No. 731 had been used as the Chief Mechanical Engineer's (CME) locomotive since 1886, based at Horwich and attached to a combined bogied tender-saloon vehicle.  It passed back to the LNWR when the L&YR amalgamation of 1922 and into the London Midland and Scottish Railway (LMS) in 1923 at the grouping.  It was scrapped when the LMS CME department moved to Derby.

References 

London and North Western Railway locomotives
2-4-0 locomotives
Railway locomotives introduced in 1866